The 2009–10 Spartan South Midlands Football League season is the 13th in the history of Spartan South Midlands Football League a football competition in England.

Premier Division

The Premier Division featured 18 clubs which competed in the division last season, along with four new clubs:

Dunstable Town, relegated from the Southern Football League
Hatfield Town, promoted from Division One
Hillingdon Borough, relegated from the Isthmian League
Royston Town, promoted from Division One

Also, Aylesbury Vale changed name to Aylesbury.

League table

Division One

Division One featured 17 clubs which competed in the division last season, along with four new clubs:

AFC Dunstable, promoted from Division Two
Cockfosters, relegated from the Premier Division
Hadley, promoted from Division Two
Holmer Green, relegated from the Premier Division

League table

Division Two

Division Two featured 15 clubs, which started the previous season, including Milton Keynes Wanderers, who didn't finished it and one new club:
Berkhamsted

League table

References

External links
 Spartan South Midlands Football League

2009–10
9